Computer Zeitung was the first German computer magazine, founded in 1970, and launched at the first CeBIT computer expo.  It was published weekly on Mondays, in the Berliner newspaper format.

The publisher was the Konradin Verlag, with Rainer Huttenloher as the editor-in-chief since 2002.

History
Since October 2009, the homepage of the Computerzeitung is not longer active and redirected to the German magazine Bild der Wissenschaft.

Since December 2010 a new Computerzeitung is available in Switzerland. The monthly magazine is available for free, with about 200,000 units per month.

References

External links
  (redirected to the German magazine "Bild der Wissenschaft")
 
 Computer Zeitung, at Konradin Verlag
 Computer Zeitung, Leser-Analyse Computerpresse 2008
 ComputerZeitung Switzerland, Home of the Swiss Computerzeitung

1970 establishments in Germany
2009 disestablishments in Germany
Defunct computer magazines
Defunct magazines published in Germany
Computer magazines published in Germany
German-language magazines
Magazines established in 1970
Magazines disestablished in 2009
Weekly magazines published in Germany